Abdel Mohsen Saad (born 31 December 1936) is an Egyptian rower. He competed at the 1960 Summer Olympics and the 1964 Summer Olympics.

References

External links
 
 

1936 births
Living people
Egyptian male rowers
Olympic rowers of Egypt
Rowers at the 1960 Summer Olympics
Rowers at the 1964 Summer Olympics